Phương Sơn may refer to several places in Vietnam, including:

 , a ward of Nha Trang.
 Phương Sơn, Bắc Giang, a rural commune of Lục Nam District.